Robert deLauer (August 30, 1920 – November 27, 2002) was an American football center who played two seasons with the Cleveland/Los Angeles Rams of the National Football League (NFL). He played college football at the University of Southern California and attended Herbert Hoover High School in San Diego, California.

Professional career
deLauer was selected by the Cleveland Rams of the NFL with the 82nd pick in the 1942 NFL Draft. He played in thirteen games, starting six, for the Cleveland/Los Angeles Rams from 1945 to 1946.

Personal life
deLauer also appeared in the films Saturday's Hero, Peggy and Father Was a Fullback in the uncredited role of a football player.

References

External links
Just Sports Stats

1920 births
2002 deaths
Players of American football from San Francisco
American football centers
USC Trojans football players
Cleveland Rams players
Los Angeles Rams players
20th-century American male actors
American male film actors
Male actors from San Francisco